Fifth Third Center is a skyscraper located in downtown Cleveland, Ohio along Superior Avenue. It is currently the sixth tallest building in Cleveland. It was designed by RTKL Associates and was originally constructed as Bank One Center in 1991. It was renamed in 2003, when Fifth Third Bank of Cincinnati relocated to the structure.

History
The site of the Fifth Third Center was occupied by the Hollenden House from 1890–1989. The original Hollenden House Hotel was built in 1890 but demolished in 1963. In 1963, as demolition of the Old Hollenden House Hotel was occurring, the foundation for a new 1960s style hotel was being built.

In 1989, developer John Galbreath, who had a hand in the Erieview and One Cleveland Center project, worked with Nissi Iwho Realty Trust in Tokyo to build a new tower. In 1989, Citibank agreed to finance the construction of the tower. It cost $70,000,000 to build. In 1990, as construction was progressing, Bank One Corporation took five floors and renamed the Tower as Bank One Center. 
Bank One stayed in the tower from 1991–2003. In 2002, Bank One was acquired in a massive merger with JP Morgan Chase. In 2003, Chase reduced its Cleveland presence and Bank One moved its Cleveland Operations from its Tower to the Penton/IBM/Bond Court Tower.

In 2004, Fifth Third Bank gained its Cleveland presence with acquiring the Bank One Tower and renamed it Fifth Third Center.

See also
List of tallest buildings in Cleveland

References
AIA Cleveland Chapter, A Guide to Cleveland Architecture 2nd Edition c 1996 Cleveland, OH

External links
Fifth Third Bank official website

1991 establishments in Ohio
Office buildings completed in 1991
RTKL Associates buildings
Skyscraper office buildings in Cleveland